Fernando de Mendoza Mate de Luna ( 1610 – 1692 )  was born in Cadiz. He served multiple Governorships including; Governor of Isla Margarita (Venezuela) 1649-54,Governor of Tucuman (Argentina)1681-86. He founded the city of San Fernando Valley of Catamarca in 1683, and he authorized the transfer of Tucuman. He was later appointed mayor of Santiago de Chile.

Father Lozano in his manuscript, “History of the Conquest of Paraguay”, stated that Mate de Luna was, “ a knight of notorious nobility, who enamelled with his prowess in war and illustrious example of virtue and prudence in government.”

References 

Castiglione, Antonio Virgilio: "Historia de Santiago del Estero: Muy Noble Ciudad: Siglos XVI, XVII y XVIII", Santiago del Estero, A.V. Castiglione, 2012. .
Guzmán, Gaspar Horacio: "Historia Colonial de Catamarca, Poblamientos, Fundaciones y Desenvolvimiento Social", Milton Editores, 1985. 
Andrada de Bosch, Elsa: "Para una historia de la ciudad de San Fernando del Valle de Catamarca", Ediciones del Boulevard, 2004. .

1610 births
1692 deaths
Date of birth unknown
Date of death unknown
Place of death unknown
People from Cádiz
Mayors of Santiago
Governors of Tucumán Province
Governors of Margarita Province